Descent from the Cross may refer to:

The Descent from the Cross (Rembrandt, 1633)
The Descent from the Cross (Rembrandt, 1634)
The Descent from the Cross (Rembrandt, 1650–52)